Black Knight is a 1980 pinball machine designed by Steve Ritchie (who also provides the Knight's voice) and released by Williams Electronics. Ritchie designed two sequels: Black Knight 2000, released by Williams in 1989, and Black Knight: Sword of Rage, released by Stern Pinball in 2019.

Description
This game is known for its two-level playfield (a first for a pinball game), and introduced the patented "Magna-Save", in which a player-controlled magnet is used to prevent outlane drains.  This was first of a series of four games that were both two-level and featured magna-save.  The later games (Jungle Lord, Pharaoh, Solar Fire, Grand Lizard) feature a variable type magna-save in that the magnet is energized as long as the player likes (up to the time they have earned); on Black Knight the machine controls the magnet time (adjustable by the operator from three to ten seconds).  Magna-save was activated by pressing one of two buttons placed on each side of the cabinet, just above the flipper buttons. The sequel to Black Knight abandoned the variable magna-save which had become standard at that point and reverted to a fixed time. Balls drained down the outlane in spite of using magna-save caused the machine to laugh at the player, reinforcing the theme of the game as an evil knight vs. the player.

Black Knight was not the first game to have electromagnets installed - an earlier example is Williams' Electronics Gorgar (the first "talking" pinball game), which features an area of the playfield that when hit, holds the ball on an electromagnet for a second or two while a speech call plays.

Other notable features of Black Knight are a loud  riding bell instead of the old familiar knock when a special (free game) was won, three ball multi-ball that did not require any previous targets to be hit before allowing balls to lock, and random score targets.

Design Team
Design: Steve Ritchie
Art: Tony Rumunni
Software: Larry DeMar
November 1980
Production: 13,075

Game quotes
"You cannot fight and win!"
"The Black Knight will slay you!"
"I challenge thee to fight me!"
"I cannot slay you, you win."
"Will you challenge the Black Knight again?"

Digital versions
Black Knight was formerly available as a licensed table in any version of The Pinball Arcade until June 30, 2018 - due to WMS license expiration. The table is also included in the Pinball Hall of Fame: The Williams Collection. Black Knight is ROM-emulated only in PC version, but in the rest of platforms this table is scripted, like in Pinball Hall Of Fame The Williams Collection (each platform). Unlicensed recreations of the game are available for Visual Pinball.

Black Knight 2000 was also released as a licensed table on The Pinball Arcade. This table features ROM emulation.

Both Black Knight (1980) and Black Knight 2000 had to be taken down just before June 30, 2018 - WMS license expiration date.

See also
Black Knight 2000
Medieval Madness

References

External links
IPDB listing for Black Knight
IPSND listing for Black Knight
Pinpedia listing for Black Knight

Williams pinball machines
1980 pinball machines